Bukit Bintang is a Monorail station located in Bukit Bintang, Kuala Lumpur. As part of the KL Monorail line, it opened alongside the rest of the train service on August 31, 2003.

This monorail station is not interchangeable (or integrated) and not to be confused with the separate but adjacent Bukit Bintang MRT station, which is serviced by the MRT Kajang Line instead.

History
The monorail station was opened on Hari Merdeka, 31 August 2003, along with the rest of the KL Monorail line.

The station was officially expanded on 13 September 2015 under the KL Monorail expansion program to accommodate new 4-car monorail trains by Scomi (Scomi SUTRA), and opened up 3 new entrances that directly leads to neighbouring malls.

Station Naming Rights Programme

Formerly known as the Bukit Bintang station since its opening on 2003, the station was renamed to AirAsia - Bukit Bintang on 9 October 2015 after Malaysian low-cost airline AirAsia was given naming rights by station owner Prasarana Malaysia, under the Station Naming Rights Programme. Nonetheless, the contract terminated in 2019 and all the signages which carry AirAsia title were removed in the station.

Location 
The station is situated at Bukit Bintang (translated from Malay to English as "Starhill"), a shopping hub in the Kuala Lumpur Golden Triangle commercial district. The monorail station is erected over Jalan Sultan Ismail, where it is located directly south from the Jalan Sultan Ismail - Jalan Bukit Bintang intersection.

Due to its proximity to Bukit Bintang, the monorail station receives a high volume of passengers during peak hours and non-working days.

Interchange
Bukit Bintang MRT station of the MRT Sungai Buloh-Kajang Line and Bukit Bintang Monorail station are in the strict sense, two distinct stations, although both originally had the same names (now distinct with the new branding). Paid zone-to-paid zone integration between the two is proposed but not observable at the moment. The AirAsia branding, used on the Monorail station (hence AirAsia-Bukit Bintang) was not extended to the underground MRT station, which uses a different branding (the nearby Pavilion Kuala Lumpur). Passengers will have to walk along the Yayasan Selangor building or Lot 10 shopping mall to get to the MRT station from the monorail station, and vice versa.

Position within the Klang Valley Integrated Transit System
The Bukit Bintang station is the first monorail station (alongside three other stations) towards the Titiwangsa station to be lined along Jalan Sultan Ismail. The line towards the Kuala Lumpur Sentral station thereafter turns west towards Jalan Imbi at the Jalan Sultan Ismail - Jalan Imbi intersection.

The station is one of four Kuala Lumpur Monorail stations that serves the Kuala Lumpur Golden Triangle locality, the other three being the Raja Chulan station (500 metres away), the Imbi station (also 500 metres away), and the Hang Tuah station (connected to the Ampang Line LRT).

Layout

Station layout plan

The station has five signed exits. Similar to the nearby Imbi station, the Bukit Bintang station is also directly within walking distance from various other shopping centres (including the Starhill Gallery, Low Yat Plaza, Pavilion KL, Fahrenheit 88, Lot 10, Imbi Plaza and Sungei Wang Plaza). The station is also the only Kuala Lumpur Monorail station to include an overhead link bridge that directly connects its two train platforms, instead of a link under the monorail platforms and track. The station's length is also longer in comparison with certain KL Monorail stations.

Exits and Entrances

Around the station
 Fahrenheit 88
 Lot 10
 Starhill Gallery
 Sungei Wang Plaza
 Pavilion Kuala Lumpur
 Bukit Bintang MRT station

See also

 List of rail transit stations in Klang Valley
 Bukit Bintang
 Bukit Bintang MRT station

References

Kuala Lumpur Monorail stations
Sungai Buloh-Kajang Line
Railway stations opened in 2003